Otto Meili (born 14 April 1929) was a Swiss racing cyclist. He rode in the 1953 Tour de France.

References

1929 births
Possibly living people
Swiss male cyclists